Gianrico Carofiglio (born 30 May 1961) is a novelist and former anti-Mafia judge in the Italian city of Bari. His debut novel, Involuntary Witness, published in 2002 and translated into English in 2005 by Patrick Creagh, was published by the Bitter Lemon Press and has been adapted as the basis for a popular television series in Italy. The subsequent novels were translated by Howard Curtis and Antony Shugaar.

Carofiglio won the 2005 Premio Bancarella award for his novel "Il passato è una terra straniera". He is also Honorary President of The Edinburgh Gadda Prize which celebrates the work of Carlo Emilio Gadda.

Background
Gianrico Carofiglio was born in Bari and has worked for many years as a prosecutor specialized in organized crime. He was appointed as advisor of the anti-Mafia committee in the Italian Parliament in 2007 and served as a senator from 2008 to 2013.

Writing career 
He makes his début in fiction in 2002 with Testimone inconsapevole (Involuntary Witness, Premio del Giovedì “Marisa Rusconi”, Premio Rhegium Iulii, Premio Città di Cuneo, Premio Città di Chiavari), the book that introduces the beloved character of the defense lawyer Guido Guerrieri, who is also the protagonist of the novels Ad occhi chiusi (A Walk in the Dark, 2003, Premio Lido di Camaiore, Premio delle Biblioteche di Roma and “Best International Noir of the year 2007” in Germany, elected by a jury of booksellers and journalists), Ragionevoli dubbi (Reasonable Doubts, 2006, Premio Fregene and Premio Viadana 2007, Premio Tropea 2008), Le perfezioni provvisorie (Temporary Perfections, 2010, Premio Selezione Campiello), La regola dell'equilibro (A Fine Line, 2014) and La misura del tempo (The Measure of Time, 2019, Premio Strega 2020 finalist).

Officer of the Carabinieri Pietro Fenoglio is the protagonist of another series of novels: Una mutevole verità (A Shifting Truth, 2014, Premio Scerbanenco), L’estate fredda (The Cold Summer, 2016), La versione di Fenoglio (Fenoglio’s Version, 2019).

Among Carofiglio’s other fiction and nonfiction works: the novels Il passato è una terra straniera (The Past is a Foreign Land, 2004, Premio Bancarella 2005), which became in 2008 an internationally acclaimed film, directed by Daniele Vicari and starring Michele Riondino and Elio Germano (Knight Grand Jury Prize and Best Actor at the Miami Film Festival), Né qui né altrove. Una notte a Bari (Neither Here Nor Elsewhere. A Night in Bari, 2008), Il silenzio dell’onda (The Silence of the Wave, 2011, shortlisted at Premio Strega 2012, Bronze Winner in the Foreword Book of the Year Awards for Mystery 2013), Il bordo vertiginoso delle cose (The Vertiginous Edge of Things, 2013), Le tre del mattino (Three O'Clock in the Morning, 2017); the graphic novel Cacciatori nelle tenebre (Hunters in Darkness, 2007,Premio Martoglio) and La casa nel bosco (The House in the Woods, 2014, Premio Riviera delle Palme), both written with his brother Francesco; the dialogue Il paradosso del poliziotto (The Policeman’s Paradox, 2009); the short stories collection Non esiste saggezza (There is No Wisdom, 2010, Premio Chiara, 2020) and Passeggeri notturni (Night Passengers, 2016); the essays L’arte del dubbio (The Art of Doubt, 2007), La manomissione delle parole (Manumitting Words, 2010), which has been adapted into a stage play performed by the author himself, Con parole precise. Breviario di scrittura civile (With Exact Words, 2015), the interview with Jacopo Rosatelli Con i piedi nel fango (Feet in the Mud, 2018) and Della gentilezza e del coraggio. Breviario di politica e altre cose (On Kindness and Courage, 2020).

The six Guerrieri novels, the Fenoglio series, Il passato è una terra straniera, Né qui né altrove, Non esiste saggezza, La manomissione delle parole, Il bordo vertiginoso delle cose, La casa nel bosco, Passeggeri notturni, Le tre del mattino, Con i piedi nel fango and Della gentilezza e del coraggio are also audiobooks read by the author. In 2020 was released L'avvocato Guerrieri, Gianrico Carofiglio's first audio-series. Gianrico 

Carofiglio’s books have sold six million copies and have been translated or are going to be translated all over the world.

Bibliography

Guido Guerrieri 
 Involuntary Witness - 2005 (Testimone Inconsapevole) translated by Patrick Creagh published in English - 
 A Walk in the Dark - 2006 (Ad Occhi Chiusi) translated by Howard Curtis published in English - 
 Reasonable Doubts - 2007 (Ragionevoli Dubbi) translated by Howard Curtis published in English - 
 Temporary Perfections - 2011 (Le Perfezioni Provvisorie) translated by Antony Shugaar published in English - 
 A fine line - 2014, (La regola dell'equilibrio) translated by Howard Curtis published in English - 
 The Measure of Time - 2021

Other
 The Past is a Foreign Country - 2004 (Il passato è una terra straniera) published in English in 2007
 Neither Here Nor Elsewhere. A Night in Bari - 2008 (Né qui né altrove. Una notte a Bari)
 There is no Wisdom - 2010 (Non Esiste Saggezza)
 The Setting-free of Words - 2010 (La Manomissione Delle Parole)
 The Silence of the Wave - 2011 (Il silenzio dell'onda) published in English in 2013 by Bitter Lemon Press - 
 The Vertiginous Edge of Things - 2013 (Il Bordo Vertiginoso delle Cose)
 A Changing Truth - 2014 (Una mutevole verità)
 The Cold Summer - 2016 (L’estate fredda)

References

External links
 Carofiglio's official site (in Italian)
 The Edinburgh Gadda Prize

20th-century Italian judges
21st-century Italian novelists
1961 births
Living people
Bancarella Prize winners
Antimafia